Kévin Barralon (born 24 June 1982 in Oullins) is a French professional football player. Currently, he plays in the Championnat National for AS Beauvais Oise.

He played on the professional level in Ligue 2 for Nîmes Olympique and Stade Reims.

He played for the main squad of Lille OSC in Coupe de France.

In 2004, he spent time on trial with Gillingham FC but could not agree terms.

References

1982 births
Living people
French footballers
Ligue 2 players
Nîmes Olympique players
Lille OSC players
Stade de Reims players
AS Moulins players
AS Beauvais Oise players
Pau FC players
Association football forwards
People from Oullins
Sportspeople from Lyon Metropolis
Footballers from Auvergne-Rhône-Alpes